Sobolew may refer to the following places in Poland:
Sobolew, Lower Silesian Voivodeship (south-west Poland)
Sobolew, Lublin Voivodeship (east Poland)
Sobolew, Masovian Voivodeship (east-central Poland)

See also
Sobolev